Munida aequalis is a species of squat lobster in the family Munididae. It was first described in 2004 by Shane Ahyong and GartyPoore.The species name is derived from the Latin aequalis, meaning "like" or "same", referring to the similar size of the terminal spines of the basal antennular segment.

References

Squat lobsters
Crustaceans described in 2004
Taxa named by Shane T. Ahyong